Notable criminally-active gangs in the Philippines include:

Akyat-Bahay Gang
Bahala Na Gang
Budol-Budol Gang
Dugo-Dugo Gang
Kuratong Baleleng
Martilyo Gang
Salisi Gang
Zesto Gang
Satanas (gang)
Sigue Sigue Sputnik 
Waray-Waray gangs

See also
Crime in the Philippines

References

Philippines
Gangs